Fatima El Jazouli is a Moroccan former footballer. She has been a member of the Morocco women's national team.

International career
El Jazouli capped for Morocco at senior level during the 2000 African Women's Championship and the 2002 African Women's Championship qualification.

See also
 List of Morocco women's international footballers

References

External links

Living people
People from Agadir
Moroccan women's footballers
Morocco women's international footballers
Year of birth missing (living people)
Women's association footballers not categorized by position